Sanaullah, also spelled Thanaullah is a male Muslim given name and surname, meaning praise of God. Notable people with the name include:

Qadi Thanaullah Panipati (died 1810), Early modern Northwestern Indian Islamic scholar
Rana Sanaullah Khan (born 1955), Pakistani lawyer
Sanaullah Baloch, Pakistani politician

Arabic masculine given names
Pakistani masculine given names